Larry Riley (June 20, 1952 – June 6, 1992) was an American actor and musician, best known for his role as C.J. Memphis in the film A Soldier's Story (1984) and as Frank Williams in the prime-time TV soap opera Knots Landing.

Early life and career
Born in Memphis, Tennessee, Riley began acting in high school before studying drama at Memphis State University. He made his professional stage debut in 1971, and went on to appear in various stage productions on and off-Broadway including A Broadway Musical, Shakespeare's Cabaret, I Love My Wife, and Big River, a musical based on Adventures of Huckleberry Finn. In 1982, Riley won a Clarence Derwent and Obie Award for his performance in A Soldier's Play. He later reprised the role in the 1984 film based on the play. From 1984 to 1985, Riley portrayed the role of Curtis Taylor, Jr. in the national touring company of Dreamgirls. He also appeared as the leading player in the U.S. touring company of Pippin.

From 1980 to 1982, Riley portrayed Calvin Barnes in the NBC daytime soap opera The Doctors. He later had guest roles on Hill Street Blues and Miami Vice, and appeared in Louis Malle's 1984 film Crackers. In 1985, Riley starred in the short-lived sitcom Stir Crazy, based on the 1980 film of the same name. In 1988, he won the role of Frank Williams on the long-running nighttime soap Knots Landing, becoming the series' first regular African American cast member. The role garnered Riley a Soap Opera Digest Award for Outstanding Actor in a Primetime Supporting Role in 1991.  Riley also created a musical tribute to Louis Jordan entitled "Let The Good Times Roll", which enjoyed success at the Cinegrill of the Hollywood Roosevelt Hotel in 1988.
He also voiced the arch-villain Dumping Jack Trash in the children's animated series Fantastic Max.

In addition to acting, Riley was also a musician and singer. He performed two songs in his role as Reverend Gillis in the Emmy-nominated Polly and the following year's sequel, Polly! Comin' Home. He sang in several episodes of Knots Landing and also composed the score for several episodes.

Illness and death
In May 1989, Riley entered rehab for drug and alcohol abuse. The following year, he discovered he was HIV positive. According to his wife Nina, Riley "was not gay. He was not bisexual. He did not use needles at all. He speculated it was from a woman. Because he was quite the womanizer." Fearful that news of his diagnosis would ruin his career, Riley did not disclose his illness to anyone except his wife and continued working on Knots Landing until his death. To explain his dramatic weight loss, Riley claimed that he was suffering from kidney failure due to high blood pressure. Riley's true illness was revealed by his wife and doctor after his death.

On June 6, 1992, Riley died of AIDS-related kidney failure in Burbank, California, only fourteen days short of his 39th birthday. He was survived by his second wife Nina and a son, Larry, Jr.

The Memphis Theatre Awards (now called "The Ostrander Awards") have, since his death, been annually presenting the "Larry Riley Award" to the best local young thespian in the college or community theatre scene who is about to embark on a professional theatre career. It is the only award of the approximately 50 annual awards that is accompanied with a check.

Filmography

Awards and nominations

References

External links
 
 
 
 ArtistswithAIDS.org

African-American male actors
AIDS-related deaths in California
American male film actors
American male musical theatre actors
American male soap opera actors
American male stage actors
American male television actors
American male voice actors
American television composers
Deaths from kidney failure
Singers from Tennessee
Male actors from Memphis, Tennessee
University of Memphis alumni
1952 births
1992 deaths
20th-century American male actors
20th-century American composers
20th-century African-American male singers